Mahmoud Abu Warda (born 31 May 1995), also known as Modi, is a Palestinian professional footballer who plays as a winger for West Bank Premier League club Shabab Al-Khalil and the Palestine national team.

Career statistics

International goals
 As of match played on 14 June 2022. Palestine score listed first, score column indicates score after each Abu Warda goal.

Honours
Palestine
 Bangabandhu Cup: 2020

References

External links
 
 
 

1995 births
Living people
Palestinian footballers
Palestine international footballers
Association football midfielders
Footballers at the 2014 Asian Games
Palestine youth international footballers
Markaz Balata players
People from Nablus Governorate
Asian Games competitors for Palestine
West Bank Premier League players
Footballers at the 2018 Asian Games